Thurnham Castle or Godard's Castle is situated to the north of the village of Thurnham which is 3 miles north-east of Maidstone, Kent.

It is a 12th-century flint-built castle constructed by Robert of Thurnham in the reign of Henry II on a hill on the edge of the North Downs.  One side of the bailey wall still stands 10 foot high and originally it enclosed an area of about a quarter of an acre.

In the 12th century, the site belonged to the de Say family and then the Thurnhams.

The site has been acquired by Kent County Council and included in the White Horse Millennium wood and Country Park Project. Much of the site has been cleared of undergrowth and public access has been provided.

See also
List of scheduled monuments in Maidstone

References
Fry, Plantagenet Somerset, The David & Charles Book of Castles, David & Charles, 1980.

External links
A Brief History of Thurnham, Thurnham Parish Council

Castles in Kent
Borough of Maidstone
History of Kent
Ruins in Kent